The 2nd Guldbagge Awards ceremony, presented by the Swedish Film Institute, honored the best Swedish films of 1964 and 1965, and took place on 15 October 1965. Swedish Wedding Night directed by Åke Falck was presented with the award for Best Film.

Awards
 Best Film: Swedish Wedding Night by Åke Falck
 Best Director: Arne Sucksdorff for My Home Is Copacabana
 Best Actor: Jarl Kulle for Swedish Wedding Night
 Best Actress: Eva Dahlbeck for The Cats
 Special Achievement: Leif Furhammar

References

External links
Official website
Guldbaggen on Facebook
Guldbaggen on Twitter
2nd Guldbagge Awards at Internet Movie Database

1965 in Sweden
1965 film awards
Guldbagge Awards ceremonies
October 1965 events in Europe
1960s in Stockholm